The Ministry of National Education, Early Education, and Athletics is a ministry of the Moroccan government responsible for early education in Morocco.

History 
In 1999, King Mohammed VI announced the National Charter for Education and Training. In the same year, a committee dedicated to education was established to reform the educational system in Morocco.

On July 15, 2002, decree number 2.02.382 set the regulations for the Ministry of National Education, Early Education, and Athletics.

Under Said Amzazi, Morocco passed the framework-law 51.17 summer 2019.

References 

Education in Morocco
Government of Morocco